Xiphoceriana atrox is a species of grasshoppers belonging to the family Pamphagidae.

Description

Distribution
This species is present in Africa, East Tropical Africa, Tanzania.

Bibliography
 Bolívar, I. (1916) Orthoptera. Fam. Acrididae. Subfam. Pamphaginae, Genera Insectorum, V. Verteneuil & L. Desmet, Brussels 170:40 pp., 1 pl
 Dirsh (1956) The phallic complex in Acridoidea (Orthoptera) in relation to taxonomy, Transactions of the Royal Entomological Society of London (Trans. R. Entomol. Soc. London) 108(7):223-356
 Dirsh (1958) Revision of the group Portheti (Orthoptera: Acridoidea), Eos, Revista española de Entomología (Eos) 34:299-400
 Dirsh (1965), The African Genera of Acridoidea, Cambridge University Press, Antilocust Centre, London 579 pp.
 Gerstaecker (1869), Archiv für Naturgeschichte, Leipzig (N.F.) (Arch. Naturgesch., Leipzig (N.F.)) 35(1)
 Hemp, C. (2009) Annotated list of Caelifera (Orthoptera) of Mt. Kilimanjaro, Journal of Orthoptera Research (Jour. Orth. Res.) 18(2):183–214
 Johnston, H.B. (1956), Annotated catalogue of African grasshoppers, The Cambridge University Press, Cambridge 833 pp.
 Johnston, H.B. (1968), Annotated catalogue of African grasshoppers, The Cambridge University Press, Cambridge Suppl:448 pp.
 Karsch (1896) Neue Orthopteren aus dem tropischen Afrika, Stettiner Entomologische Zeitung (Stett. Entomol. Z.) 57:242-359
 Kevan, D.K.M. (1957) Orthoptera-Caelifera from northern Kenya and Jubaland. II. Pamphagidae, Pyrgomorphidae, Lentulidae and Romaleinae, Opuscula Entomologica, Lund (Opuscula Entomologica) 22:193-208
 Uvarov (1966), Grasshoppers & Locusts. A Handbook of General Acridology, Cambridge University Press, London 1:481 pp.

References

Pamphagidae
Insects described in 1869